Kred is a village in the Municipality of Kobarid in the Littoral region of Slovenia. It is located in the Breginj Combe.

The parish church in the centre of the village is dedicated to Saint Nicholas.

Notable people
Notable people that were born or lived in Kred include:
Joža Lovrenčič (1890–1952), expressionist poet and educator

References

External links

Kred at Geopedia

Populated places in the Municipality of Kobarid